Kim S. Benefield was a Democratic member of the Alabama Senate, representing the 13th District from 2006 to 2010.

References

External links
Alabama State Legislature - Senator Kim S. Benefield official government website
Project Vote Smart - Senator Kim S. Benefield (AL) profile
Follow the Money - Kim S Benefield
2006 campaign contributions

Alabama state senators
Living people
Women state legislators in Alabama
Year of birth missing (living people)
21st-century American women